Elgin Park Secondary is a public high school in School District 36 Surrey. It is referred to as the 'Home of the Orcas'. Elgin Park is one of four public high schools on the peninsula, along with Earl Marriott Secondary School, Semiahmoo Secondary School, and Grandview Heights Secondary School.

Academics 

Elgin Park Secondary offers the Integrated Program, as well as the Science Co-op and Humanities Co-op programs. For 2017–2018, Elgin Park Secondary was ranked 57/253 in the Province (42/246 in the past five years) by the Fraser Institute and has boasted an average of 98.80% of students graduating (2017-2018). Elgin Park Secondary offers Advanced Placement classes. In 2021, the AP Calculus class averaged 4.74 (out of 5) on the exam, a score that was in the top 5% in the world.

Building
Both Elgin Park and Tamanawis Secondary schools (both located in School District 36 Surrey) have virtually the same architectural basis.

Extra Curricular 

Elgin Park Secondary offers many Extra Curricular services, such extracurriculars include various sports teams and school bands.

Basketball 

2005-Basketball - Jr Girls Provincial Champions

2008-Basketball - Sr Girls Provincial Champions

Volleyball 
2000-Volleyball - Sr Boys Provincial Champions

Soccer 

2009-Soccer     - Sr Girls Fraser Valley Champions

2015-Soccer      - Sr Girls Fraser Valley Champions (#1 ranked in BC)

Hockey 

2014-Hockey      - Provincial Champions Tier III

2015-Hockey      - Provincial Champions Tier II

Rugby 

2015-Rugby         -Surrey Champions Tier ll
- Provincial Champions Tier II

Cross Country 

2021- Cross Country     - Provincial Champions

References

External links 
 

High schools in Surrey, British Columbia
Educational institutions established in 1993
1993 establishments in British Columbia